is a city located in Shizuoka Prefecture, Japan. , the city had an estimated population of 36,865 in 21,593 households and a population density of 600 persons per km2.

Geography
Atami is located in the far eastern corner of Shizuoka Prefecture at the northern end of Izu Peninsula. The city is on the steep slopes of a partially submerged volcanic caldera on the edge of Sagami Bay. The name "Atami" literally means "hot ocean," a reference to the town's famous onsen hot springs. The city boundaries include the offshore island of Hatsushima. Most of Atami is located within the Fuji-Hakone-Izu National Park. Warmed by the Kuroshio Current offshore, the area is known for its moderate maritime climate with hot, humid summers, and short winters.

Surrounding municipalities
Shizuoka Prefecture
Kannami
Izunokuni
Itō
Kanagawa Prefecture
Yugawara

Climate
The city has a climate characterized by hot and humid summers, and relatively mild winters (Köppen climate classification: Cfa).

Demographics
Per Japanese census data, the population of Atami has been in slow decline over the past 25 years.

History
Atami has been known as a resort town centered on its hot springs since the 8th century AD. In the Kamakura period, Minamoto no Yoritomo and Hōjō Masako were notable visitors. During the Edo period, all of Izu Province was tenryō territory under direct control of the Tokugawa shogunate. During the cadastral reform of the early Meiji period in 1889, Atami village was organized within Kamo District, Shizuoka. It was elevated to town status on June 11, 1894, and was transferred to the administrative control of Tagata District in 1896.

The epicenter of the Great Kantō earthquake in 1923 was deep beneath Izu Ōshima Island in Sagami Bay, close to Atami, which suffered considerable damage, as did other municipalities throughout the surrounding Kantō region. The tsunami wave height reached 11 meters (35 feet) at Atami, swamping the town and drowning three hundred people.

The modern city of Atami was founded on April 10, 1937, through the merger of Atami Town with neighboring Taga Village. After the proclamation of Atami as an "International Tourism and Culture City" by the Japanese government in 1950, the area experienced rapid growth in large resort hotel development. This growth increased after Atami station became a stop on the Tōkaidō Shinkansen high-speed train line in 1964. In concert with its famous onsen, Atami was known for its onsen geisha. Atami experienced a considerable decline in popularity as a vacation destination due to the Japanese economic crisis in the 1990s and the associated fall in large group company-sponsored vacations, but is currently experiencing a revival as a commuter town due to its proximity to Tokyo and Yokohama.

The Izu Study and Research Center is a study facility of the Japanese Communist Party, where they hold its annual congress.

2021 landslide

Following torrential rainfall a landslide was triggered which swept through part of the city on 3 July 2021. 27 people were killed and 3 were injured.

Government
Atami has a mayor-council form of government with a directly elected mayor and a unicameral city legislature of 15 members.

Economy
The economy of Atami is heavily dependent on the tourist industry, mostly centered on its hot spring resorts. Commercial fishing is a major secondary industry.

Education
Atami has eight public elementary schools and four public junior high schools operated by the city government, and one public high school operated by the Shizuoka Prefectural Board of Education. The International University of Health and Welfare, based in Ōtawara, Tochigi, has a campus in Atami.

Transport

Railway 
 Central Japan Railway Company - Tōkaidō Shinkansen
Atami Station
 East Japan Railway Company - Tōkaidō Main Line
Atami Station
 East Japan Railway Company - Itō Line
Atami Station – Kinomiya Station – Izu-Taga Station – Ajiro Station

Highway

 Atami Beach Line
 Izu Skyline

International relations

Twin towns – Sister cities
Atami is twinned with:
 Beppu, Ōita, Japan (since August 1966)
 Sanremo, Italy (since November 1976)
 Cascais, Portugal (since July 1990)
 Zhuhai, China, (friendship city, since July 2004)

Notable people

Yū Hayami, singer, actress
Yuka Imai, voice actress
Yuji Ohno, jazz musician
Mitsuko Uchida, classical pianist

Local attractions
 MOA Museum of Art, housing the extensive art collection of eccentric multimillionaire and religious leader Mokichi Okada 
 Izusan Jinja, an ancient Shinto shrine
 Peace Pagoda, built by Nipponzan-Myōhōji in 1961.

In popular culture
In the 1951 film Tokyo File 212, a key scene takes place at a resort in Atami. 
In the 1953 film Tokyo Story the parents visit the hot springs in Atami. 
 Much of the 1953 film A Japanese Tragedy is set in Atami. 
Atami is also the setting of the TV drama Atami no Sousakan. 
Atami also appears in the 1954 film Golden Demon (Konjiki Yasha), based on the novel of the same name by Kōyō Ozaki, as the place where two main characters become engaged to be married.
 In the 1962 film King Kong vs. Godzilla, the final battle ends with Godzilla and King Kong descending Mount Fuji into the outskirts of Atami, where they destroy Atami Castle, then plunge into the ocean, with Kong emerging victorious.
 In the 1967 film Gappa, the Triphibian Monster, the two adult Gappa creatures make landfall in Atami, destroying much of it in the process.
In the Studio Ghibli anime drama Only Yesterday, the  main character Taeko goes to Atami at age 10, visiting some of the onsen, but she passes out in the Roman bath from dizziness.
In the 2016 anime Prince of Stride, Atami is the first stop in the End of Summer Trial Tour.
In the 89th episode of the anime "Urusei Yatsura", Mrs. Moroboshi wins a 2-day trip to Atami with her husband, leaving her son Ataru, the main character, at home alone with Lum.
In the 2019 video game AI: The Somnium Files, protagonist Kaname Date is a detective solving a murder mystery. In one of the game's endings, he quits the case and goes with a woman to Atami.  In the 2022 sequel, AI: The Somnium Files – Nirvana Initiative, protagonist Kuruto Ryuki can have a similar ending with the same woman.

Notes

References 
 Hammer, Joshua. (2006).  Yokohama Burning: The Deadly 1923 Earthquake and Fire that Helped Forge the Path to World War II. New York: Simon & Schuster.  ;  (cloth).

External links 

Official Website 

Cities in Shizuoka Prefecture
Populated coastal places in Japan